A carriage control tape was a loop of punched tape that was used to synchronize rapid vertical page movement in most IBM and many other line printers from unit record days through the 1980's. The tape loop was as long as the length of a single page. A pin wheel moved the tape accurately using holes in the center of the tape. A hole punched in one of the other channels represented a particular position on the page. Channel one was typically used to indicate the top of the page and might be the only channel used. Another channel might indicate the summary line on an invoice, enabling rapid skipping to that line. IBM provides a special manual punch that allowed accurate placement of the channel punches. Skipping occurred under computer control, but a form feed switch on the printer control panel allowed a manual skip to the top of the page. The tapes could be easily changed when new, continuously fed forms were loaded into the printer.

Forms control buffer
Newer printers use a "forms control buffer" (FCB), which is an electronic image of the physical carriage control tape. A job can request a specific FCB for a printout, and it will be loaded before printing is started, eliminating operator intervention.

Conventions
Conventionally, channel 1 indicates the top of the form (the first printable line on a page, often but not necessarily the first line of the page), and a new form is started with a "skip to channel 1" command (skipping is much faster than line spacing). Channel 9 is positioned a few lines above the end of the page, so a system that could sense the printer status while printing would, for example, have room to print a page footer or totals. Channel 12 indicates the last printable line of the form. These are only conventions, however, and applications are free to establish their own standards.

Sources

 IBM 407 manual p.129 ff
 Excerpt on printing from IBM 1130 manual
 Rack for holding carriage tapes at Computer History Museum

External links
 Two IBM carriage control tape punches in the Computer History Museum collection: , 
 Another image of a carriage control tape punch at ibmcolletables.com: 

IBM printers
Computer storage tape media